Mohammad Roem (16 May 1908 – 24 September 1983) was an Indonesian politician and diplomat. He served in various positions during his career in government, including as Minister of Home Affairs, Minister of Foreign Affairs, and Deputy Prime Minister of Indonesia. He played a central role in negotiating the Roem–Van Roijen Agreement during the Indonesian National Revolution (1945–1949), which laid the groundwork for the Dutch-Indonesian Round Table Conference wherein the Dutch finally recognized the sovereignty of Indonesia.

Born into a Javanese family, Roem studied law at the Rechts Hogeschool in Batavia (now Jakarta), during which time he had become politically active in the nationalist movement. After graduating, he worked as a lawyer during the Japanese occupation period (1942–1945). Following the proclamation of independence in 1945, Roem joined the newly-formed Republican government where he emerged as an able diplomat and became the Republic's principal negotiator with the Dutch. After the handover of sovereignty in 1949, Roem remained active in politics and in the Masyumi Party. Opposed to President Sukarno's Guided Democracy, he was arrested and jailed in 1961. Following his release in 1966, after Sukarno's fall from power, he was elected chairman of the Parmusi Party (Masyumi's successor). However, he was prevented from taking office by the new regime. He devoted most of his remaining years to study and writing. He died in 1983.

Early life 

Roem was born in Parakan, Temanggung, Central Java, on May 16, 1908. His father's name was Dulkarnaen Djojosasmito, and his mother's name was Siti Tarbijah. He moved to Pekalongan because Parakan was hit by an outbreak of infectious diseases like cholera, plague, and influenza. In 1915, he studied at Volksschool and two years later continued to Hollandse Inlandsche School until 1924. In 1924, he received a scholarship to study at the School tot Opleiding van Inlandsche Artsen ("school for the training of native physicians", STOVIA) after attending government examinations. Three years later, he completed the preliminary test and was transferred to Algemene Middelbare School, and graduated in 1930. After attending the admission test of Medical College, and was rejected, he turned to law, entering Rechts Hoogeschool in 1932 and obtained the degree Meester in de Rechten in 1939.

Career 

During the Indonesian national awakening, he was active in several organizations such as Jong Islamieten Bond in 1924 and Sarekat Islam in 1925. During the revolution, he was a member of the Indonesian delegation at the Linggarjati Agreement (1946) and Renville Agreement (1948). In 1949, he was also the leader of the delegation at the Roem–Van Roijen Agreement, that discussed Indonesia's borders, and which was signed on May 7, 1949.

As a state official, he served as interior minister in the Sjahrir III Cabinet, foreign minister during the Natsir Cabinet, interior minister during the Wilopo Cabinet, and deputy prime minister during the Ali Sastroamidjojo II Cabinet.

Prison 

Roem was a senior figure in the Masyumi Party, which was banned by President Sukarno in 1960 for its support of the PRRI rebellion. In 1962 he was arrested and jailed without trial in Madiun, together with Sutan Sjahrir, Anuk Agung, the sultan of Pontianak Hamid and Soedarpo Sastrosatomo. They were released by attorney-general Sugi Aito in May 1966.

Personal life 

Roem married Markisah Dahlia in 1932. They had two children; a boy, Roemoso, born in 1933 and a girl, Rumeisa, born in 1939. Roem died in September 1983 from a lung disorder, leaving a wife and two children.

References

Citations

Sources 

 
 
 
 

1908 births
1983 deaths
People from Temanggung Regency
Indonesian Muslims
Javanese people
Deaths from lung disease
Foreign ministers of Indonesia
Interior ministers of Indonesia